Tinea argodelta is a species of moth in the family Tineidae. It was described by Edward Meyrick in 1915. However the placement of this species within the genus Tinea is in doubt. As a result, this species has been referred to as Tinea (s.l.) argodelta. This species is endemic to New Zealand.

The wingspan is about 10 mm. The forewings are dark purple fuscous with two or three minute whitish strigulae on the costa towards one-third, a spot of white strigulation in the middle of the costa, a smaller spot at two-thirds, and three dots between this and the apex. There is a clear white triangular spot on the dorsum before the middle, reaching nearly half across the wing and a spot of whitish strigulation on the dorsum before the tornus, and two or three whitish scales towards the termen. The hindwings are dark purple-grey.

References

External links
Image of type specimen of Tinea s.l. argodelta.

Moths described in 1915
Tineinae
Moths of New Zealand
Endemic fauna of New Zealand
Taxa named by Edward Meyrick
Endemic moths of New Zealand